Candida, or Cándida (Spanish), may refer to:

Biology and medicine
 Candida (fungus), a genus of yeasts
 Candidiasis, an infection by Candida organisms
 Malvasia Candida, a variety of grape

Places 
 Candida, Campania, a comune in Avellino, Italy
 Candida Casa, a church in Whithorn, Dumfries and Galloway, Scotland
 Aguas Cándidas, a municipality in Burgos, Castile and León, Spain

People
 Candida (given name)
 Aldoino Filangieri di Candida (died 1283), nobleman in the Kingdom of Naples
 Candida Maria de Jesus (1845–1912), Spanish nun and saint
 Candida, pen name of Eibhlín Ní Bhriain (1925–1986)

Theatre, film and performing arts 
 Candida (play), by George Bernard Shaw
 Candida (1962 film), an Australian television adaptation
 Cándida (1939 film), a 1939 Argentine musical film drama directed by Luis Bayon Herrera
This film was followed by several others featuring the same character played by Nini Marshall including:
 Los Celos de Cándida, a 1940 sequel
 Cándida millonaria, a 1941 sequel
 Cándida, la mujer del año, a 1943 sequel
 Cándida (2006 film), a 2006 Spanish comedy by Javier Fesser
 "Candida Esperanzada", an episode of the Mexican series Mujeres Asesinas
 Candida, a character on the television series Phil of the Future

Music 
 Candida (album), by Dawn 1970
 "Candida" (song), its title track
 "Candida", a song by Ultra Vivid Scene from their 1992 album Rev

Other 
 Candida (typeface)
 SS Empire Candida, a cargo ship

See also 
 Candide (disambiguation)
 Candidus (disambiguation)